The Midlands Football League is a junior football league based in the Tayside area of Scotland. The league sits at level 6 on the Scottish football league system, acting as a feeder to the Highland Football League.

Founded in 2021, the inaugural season was contested by 19 clubs, largely from those who still remained in the SJFA East Region from the previous season. Geographically, the league covers Angus, Perth and Kinross, Dundee and Fife (all East Region clubs based further south already having left the SJFA to join the East of Scotland Football League over the previous five years).

The winners take part in an end-of-season promotion play-off with the SJFA North Superleague and North Caledonian League champions, subject to clubs meeting the required licensing criteria.

History 
On 1 April 2021, the Scottish Junior Football Association stated their aim  to establish a Midlands League for the 2021–22 season at Tier 6 of the Scottish football pyramid. 

Although there was no official announcement of the league's formation, the SJFA East Region announced the fixtures for the 2021–22 season straight away on 21 June, with 19 clubs shown as league members, Dundee St James and Letham being new clubs in addition to all members of the 2020–21 East Premiership North.

On 5 July 2021, it was announced that subject to SFA approval, the Midlands league would be joined at Tier 6 by the SJFA North Superleague and North Caledonian League to form a fully-integrated level below the Highland League from 2021–22.

Member clubs

Seasons

Cup competitions 
 Scottish Junior Cup: Known as the Macron Scottish Junior Cup for sponsorship purposes.
Knock-out tournament for all Junior Association member clubs.
East of Scotland Cup: Known as the DJ Laing East Region Cup under a sponsorship arrangement. The competition dates back to 1896–97 and was the most prestigious cup trophy in the former East Junior Football League.
Knock-out tournament for all clubs.
All matches played to a finish with penalties after 90 minutes, if required.
2 rounds before Quarter-finals.
East Region League Cup: Known as the Thorntons Property East Region League Cup under a sponsorship arrangement, this tournament was introduced for the 2018–19 season East Superleague to compensate for a reduced number of league fixtures.
Knock-out tournament for all clubs.
All matches played to a finish with penalties after 90 minutes, if required.
2 rounds before Quarter-finals.
 North and Tayside Inter-Regional Cup: Known as the Signature Signs Cup for sponsorship purposes. First played for in 1988.
Knock-out tournament for all Midlands League and North Region clubs.
Clubs play early rounds in their own region with eight sides from each area progressing to the last sixteen.

References

External links 
 Official website

6
Scot
Scottish Junior Football Association, East Region
Scottish Junior Football Association leagues
Sports leagues established in 2021
2021 establishments in Scotland
Football in Dundee
Football in Angus, Scotland
Football in Perth and Kinross
Football in Fife